Belfast is the largest city and capital of Northern Ireland. It is partly located in County Antrim and partly in County Down.

Belfast was represented in the Northern Ireland House of Commons 1921–1973. This article deals with the Belfast borough constituencies. For the County Antrim and County Down county constituencies, see Antrim (Northern Ireland Parliament constituencies) and Down (Northern Ireland Parliament constituencies). See also the List of Northern Ireland Parliament constituencies 1921-1973.

Boundaries
1921-1929: The City of Belfast was divided into four constituencies, each returning four MPs, using the single transferable vote method of proportional representation. There were four single member UK Parliament constituencies with the same names, which existed from 1885 to 1918 and since 1922. See Belfast East, Belfast North, Belfast South and Belfast West.

The Northern Ireland Parliament seats comprised the following wards of the then County Borough of Belfast (as they existed in 1921).

Belfast East: Dock, Pottinger and Victoria.

Belfast North: Clifton, Duncairn and Shankill.

Belfast South: Cromac, Ormeau and Windsor.

Belfast West: Court, Falls, St Anne's, St George's, Smithfield and Woodvale.

1929-1973: The area was divided into sixteen single member constituencies, electing MPs using the first past the post electoral system. 
 Belfast East was split into the following constituencies.

Bloomfield: Part of Pottinger ward.

Dock: Dock ward.

Pottinger: Parts of Pottinger and Victoria wards.

Victoria: Part of Victoria ward.

 Belfast North was divided into the following seats.

Clifton: Parts of Clifton and Duncairn wards.

Duncairn: Part of Duncairn ward.

Oldpark: Parts of Clifton and Shankill wards.

Shankill: Part of Shankill ward.

 Belfast South was partitioned into the following divisions.

Ballynafeigh: Part of Ormeau ward.

Cromac: Cromac ward.

Willowfield: Part of Ormeau ward.

Windsor: Windsor ward.

 Belfast West was redistributed into the following areas.

Central: Smithfield ward and part of Court, St Anne's and Woodvale wards.

Falls: Falls ward.

St. Anne's:  St George's ward and part of St Anne's ward.

Woodvale: Part of Court and Woodvale wards..

Analysis of Political Representation
 Belfast East was a predominantly Unionist area with some pockets of labour strength, returning four Unionists in 1921 and 2 Unionists, 1 Independent Unionist and a Northern Ireland Labour Party MP in 1925. After 1929 the safe unionist seat of Bloomfield elected only Unionist MPs but Dock had an Independent Unionist representative in 1953-58 and an Independent Unionist support O'Neill in 1969–73. Victoria elected a NILP MP for two terms (1958–65) but was otherwise represented by Unionists. The mostly non-unionist Pottinger was won by an NILP then Independent Labour MP 1929–49. Another NILP member served 1958–69.
 Belfast North was a predominantly Unionist area with some pockets of labour strength, returning four Unionists in 1921 and 2 Unionists, 1 Independent Unionist and a Northern Ireland Labour Party MP in 1925. Clifton was only represented by Unionist MPs, apart from an Independent Umionist 1953-58 and Pro-O'Neill Unionist 1969–73. Duncairn only had Unionist MPs. Oldpark had Northern Ireland Labour Party members 1945-49 and 1958–73. Shankill had an Independent Unionist MP 1929–53.
 Belfast South was a strongly Unionist area, returning four Unionists in 1921 and 3 Unionists and 1 Independent Unionist MP in 1925. Ballynafeigh, Cromac, and Windsor only elected Unionist MPs. Willowfield elected a NILP MP in a 1941 by-election. He was re-elected for the Commonwealth Labour Party in 1945 but by the time of the 1949 election he was a Unionist. A Pro-O'Neill Unionist served as MP 1969–73.
 Belfast West was a predominantly Unionist area with some pockets of Nationalist strength, electing 3 Unionists and 1 Nationalist in 1921 and 2 Unionist, 1 Independent Unionist and 1 Nationalist in 1925. Central and Falls never elected a Unionist MP. Central had a Nationalist MP 1929–46, a NILP MP elected in 1946 who by 1949 was Independent Labour until 1965, then a NDP MP 1965-69 and a NILP one 1969–73. Falls elected a Nationalist 1929–42, a Republican 1942–45, a Socialist Republican from 1945 who by 1953 represented the Republican Labour Party until 1969-73 when the Northern Ireland Labour Party held the seat. St. Anne's was always Unionist. Woodvale was represented by an Independent Unionist 1929-50 and a Northern Ireland Labour Party legislator 1958–65.

Summary of MPs by Party
Key to Parties: CWLP Commonwealth Labour Party, Ind Lab Independent Labour, Ind U Independent Unionist, Ind UA Independent Unionist Association, Irish LP Irish Labour Party, N Nationalist, NDP National Democratic Party, NILP Northern Ireland Labour Party, O'N U Independent Unionist supporting Terence O'Neill, Rep Republican, Rep LP Republican Labour Party, SDLP Social Democratic and Labour Party, Soc Rep Socialist Republican Party, U Ulster Unionist

 1921-1925 U 15, N 1 (1st Parliament) (see note a)
 1925-1929 U 9, Ind U 4, NILP 2, N 1 (2nd Parliament) (see note b)
 1929-1933 U 11, Ind U 2, N 2, NILP 1 (3rd Parliament)
 1933-1938 U 10, Ind U 2, N 2, NILP 2 (4th Parliament) (see note c)
 1938-1945 U 11, N 2, Ind Lab 1, Ind U 1, Ind UA 1 (5th Parliament) (see note d)
 1945-1949 U 8, Ind U 2, NILP 2, CWLP 1, Ind Lab 1, Soc Rep 1 (6th Parliament) (see note e)
 1949-1953 U 12, Ind U 2, NILP 1, Soc Rep 1 (7th Parliament) (see note f)
 1953-1958 U 12, Ind Lab 1, Ind U 1, NILP 1, Irish LP 1, Rep LP 1 (8th Parliament)
 1958-1962 U 10, NILP 4, Ind Lab 1, Rep LP 1 (9th Parliament)
 1962-1965 U 9, NILP 4, Ind Lab 1, Irish LP 1, Rep LP 1 (10th Parliament) (see note g)
 1965-1969 U 11, NILP 2, Rep LP 2, NDP 1 (11th Parliament)
 1969-1973 U 10, NILP 2, O'N U 2, Rep LP 2 (12th Parliament) (see note h)

Notes:-
(a) Joseph Devlin (N) was also elected for Antrim but chose to represent Belfast West. An Ind U gained a seat from U in a Belfast South by-election in 1923.
(b) P.J. Woods (Ind U) was elected in Belfast South and Belfast West. He decided to represent Belfast West. A U candidate won the by-election to fill the vacancy.
(c) In 1934 the MP for Pottinger was expelled from NILP and became Ind Lab
(d) 1941 the NILP gained a seat from U at a by-election, but the MP formed the CWLP before the next election. In 1942 Rep gained a N seat.
(e) In 1946 the NILP won a N seat. The CWLP MP became U before the next election.
(f) A NILP MP became Independent Labour and a Soc Rep MP became Rep LP before the next election.
(g) A Rep LP MP became Irish LP in 1964.
(h) In 1970 a Rep LP MP became SDLP.

Members of Parliament
1925(be)-1938 A.B. Babington (U) South 1925–29, Cromac 1929-38 (resigned, appointed as Lord Justice of Appeal)
1921-1929 Sir R.D. Bates (U) East
1925-1929 Jack Beattie (NILP) East
1929-1933 on-Houston (U) Dock
1965-1969 J.J. Brennan (NDP) Central
1921-1925 T.H. Burn (U) West
1921-1929 L. Campbell (U) North
1934(be)-1946 T.J. Campbell (N) Central (resigned)
1938-1945 G.A. Clark (U) Dock
1949-1953 T.L. Cole (U) Dock
1921-1934 Joseph Devlin (N) West 1921–29, Central 1929-34
1950-1961 Daniel Stewart Thomas Bingham Dixon, 2nd Baron Glentoran (U) Bloomfield (resigned)
1921-1950 Herbert Dixon, 1st Baron Glentoran (from 1939) (U) East 1921–29, Bloomfield 1929-50 (died)
1921-1925 T. Donald (U) East
1945-1949 H. Downey (NILP) Dock
1921-1925 J.A. Duff (U) East
1962-1973 Gerry Fitt (Irish LP then Rep LP then SDLP) Dock
1921-1925 W. Grant (U) North
1925-1929 J.W. Gyle (Ind U) East
1969-1973 R.L. Hall-Thompson (O'N U) Clifton
1929-1953 S.H. Hall-Thompson (U) Clifton
1946(be)-1965 F. Hanna (NILP then Ind Lab) Central
1925-1953 Tommy Henderson (Ind U) North 1925–29, Shankill 1929-53
1962-1973 J.W. Kennedy (U) Cromac
1969-1973 Paddy Kennedy (Rep LP) Central
1958-1959 R.J.C. Kinahan (U) Clifton
1925-1929 S. Kyle (NILP) North
1921-1929 Sir R. J. Lynn (U) West
1921-1929 Sir C. McCullagh (U) South
1921-1925 S. McGuffin (U) North
1921-1925 R.J. McKeown (U) North
1921-1925 Mrs J. McMordie (U) South
1925-1929 W. McMullen (NILP) West
1933-1938 Harry Midgley (NILP) Dock
1921-1937 Thomas Moles (U) South 1921–29, Ballynafeigh 1929-37 (died)
1953-1962 J.W. Morgan (U) Cromac (died)
1953-1958 M. Morgan (Irish LP) Dock 
1959-1969 W.J. Morgan (U) Clifton
1949-1973 I. Neill (U) Ballynafeigh
1958-1962 W. Oliver (U) Dock
1921-1929 H.M. Pollock (U) South
1953-1958 N. Porter (Ind U) Clifton
1961-1973 W. Scott (U) Bloomfield
1938-1953 John Maynard Sinclair (U) Cromac (died 31 January 1953) 
1937-1949 F. Thompson (U) Ballynafeigh
1921-1922 W.J. Twaddell (U) West (Assassinated by IRA)
1923(be)-1929 P.J. Woods (Ind U) West 1923–29, South 1925
1965-1972 John McQuade (U) Woodvale

Sources
 Northern Ireland Parliamentary Election Results 1921-1972, compiled and edited by Sydney Elliott (Political Reference Publications 1973)
For the exact definition of constituency boundaries see http://www.election.demon.co.uk/stormont/boundaries.html 

Constituencies of the Northern Ireland Parliament in Belfast